In Robert A. Heinlein's 1952 science fiction novel, The Rolling Stones, flat cats are a species of Martian animal which reproduce rapidly and overrun a spaceship.

Description and origin
In the chapter "Free Enterprise", the character Mr. Angelo, a shopkeeper on Mars, introduces Castor and Pollux Stone to a flat cat:

The boys take the flat cat onto the family space ship, where it soon has eight "kittens", each of which soon gives birth again, until the ship is overwhelmed with flat cats. The family solves the problem by rounding up the flat cats and putting them into the storage hold at low temperature, where they hibernate. They are later revived and sold to miners in the asteroid belt.

Flat cats v. tribbles  
Heinlein's flat cats are often said to have been the inspiration for the tribbles of the 1967 Star Trek episode "The Trouble with Tribbles". The similarities to the flat cats and some specific story events involving them was brought to the attention of the Star Trek staff when Desilu/Paramount's primary in-house clearance group, Kellam de Forest Research, submitted a report on the script on August 11, 1967, noting the similarities of “a small, featureless, fluffy, purring animal, friendly and loving, that reproduces rapidly when fed, and nearly engulfs a spaceship”. So worrisome was this matter that the producers contacted Heinlein and asked for a waiver, which Heinlein granted. In his authorized biography Heinlein said he was called by producer Gene Coon about the issue and agreed to waive claim to the "similarity" to his flat cats because he’d just been through one plagiarism lawsuit and did not wish to embroil himself in another. He had misgivings upon seeing the actual script but let it go, an action he later regretted:

Heinlein freely acknowledged that he took some inspiration from Ellis Parker Butler 1905 story "Pigs Is Pigs", but was careful not to plagiarize him, and the similarities are primarily that the creatures reproduce rapidly and overrun a place. Conversely, the tribbles copy not only the flat cats' general appearance, behavior, the effects of their purring on people, and the particulars of their reproduction when fed and unfed—but that they are obtained from a merchant who does not warn customers of their dangers, and ultimately unloaded from the ship onto another unsuspecting party.

The screenwriter of the episode, David Gerrold, admits that he had read the Heinlein book years before writing his screenplay but claims he was not consciously aware of the similarities until the Kellam de Forest report. According to him, Heinlein asked only for an autographed copy of the script and, in a note to Gerrold, “Let me add that I felt that the analogy to my flat cats was mild enough to be of no importance".

References

Fictional Martians
Fictional extraterrestrial life forms
Robert A. Heinlein